Pneumatherapy is the belief that the state of one's spirit (pneuma) influences physical health. It is influenced by pneumatology.

Concepts in alternative medicine